Thianthrene is a sulfur-containing heterocyclic chemical compound. It is a derivative of the parent heterocycle called dithiin. It is notable for its ease of oxidation.

Structure and synthesis 
Like other 1,4-dithiins but unlike its oxygen analog dibenzodioxin, the shape of thianthrene is not planar. It is bent, with a fold angle of 128° between the two benzo groups.

Thianthrene can be prepared by treating benzene with disulfur dichloride in the presence of aluminium chloride.

History 
Thianthrene was first synthesized by John Stenhouse by dry distillation of sodium benzenesulfonate. Thianthrene is oxidized by sulfuric acid forming a red radical cation. Thianthrene•+ has been characterized by Electron paramagnetic resonance. Four different publications describe the crystal structure of salts of thianthrene•+.

References